Li Rongrong (1945 – 21 December 2019) was a Chinese politician who served as Chairman of the State-owned Assets Supervision and Administration Commission.

Biography 
Li was born in Suzhou, Jiangsu, Republic of China in 1945. He graduated from the department of chemical engineering of Tianjin University, majoring in electro-chemistry.

He started working in a factory in Wuxi in July 1968, and was elevated to head of the factory in the early 1980s. From 1986, he served as vice director of economics commission of Wuxi, director of light manufacturing bureau, director of planning commission of the city, and vice director of economics planning commission of Jiangsu.

In June 1992, he was transferred to manufacturing planning bureau of manufacturing office of the State Council. From August 1992, he served in various posts in State Economic and Trade Commission (SETC). He was appointed vice director of the Commission in 1998, and became vice director and vice party chief of the Commission in December 1999. In February 2001, he was elevated to director and Party chief of SETC. He served as the chairman and Party secretary of State-owned Assets Supervision and Administration Commission of the State Council. He was a member of 16th and 17th Central Committees of the Communist Party of China.

Li died on 21 December 2019 in Beijing, aged 74.

References

1945 births
2019 deaths
Tianjin University alumni
People's Republic of China politicians from Jiangsu
Politicians from Suzhou
Chinese Communist Party politicians from Jiangsu
Members of the 16th Central Committee of the Chinese Communist Party
Members of the 17th Central Committee of the Chinese Communist Party